Elections in Hungary are held at two levels: general elections to elect the members of the National Assembly and local elections to elect local authorities. European Parliament elections are also held every 5 years.

National Assembly elections
Following a reform in 2012, general elections are now conducted under a one-round, two-ballot system. The total number of seats has been reduced and regional lists have been eliminated. The number of single-member seats has increased from 45.56% of the total to 53.3%. The first ballot is to choose MPs for 106 single-member districts using first-past-the-post. The remaining 93 party-list national seats are allocated based on the sum of second ballot list votes and wasted votes from the first ballot. Wasted votes are votes that were cast for unsuccessful candidates or surplus votes for winning candidates. This formula for allocating national seats is a cross between a parallel mixed system and a compensatory mixed system.

The 2014 elections were the first to be held according to the new system, which included the following significant changes:

 One round instead of two rounds.
 No turnout requirements; formerly, a turnout of 50% was needed for the first round and 25% for the second round.
 The National Assembly included 199 seats, reduced from 386 (i.e. 51.6% of the previous total).
 106 constituency seats, reduced from 176; their share increased from 45.6% to 53.3% of total seats.
 93 party-list seats, including minority-list seats, reduced from the 210 MMC and levelling seats; their share decreased from 54.4% to 46.7% of all seats.
 A 5% threshold remains for party lists, 10% for joint lists of two parties, 15% for joint lists of three or more parties.
 The quota for ethnic-minority lists to win seats is only one-quarter of the general quota.

Minority lists that do not reach the 5% of all minority-list votes and do not get at least one seat, will be able to send a minority spokesman to the National Assembly, who has the right to speak but not to vote. Practically, only the German and Romani minorities are numerous enough to possibly elect MPs, while the other 13 minorities have spokesmen.

 Constituency borders were changed, partly because of the reduced number of constituencies (from 176 to 106), partly because of the demographic changes in the proportion of the population of constituencies in the last 20 years. In the old system, the population of the smallest constituency was 33077, while the population of the largest one was 98167, which meant that the constituency vote of people living in larger constituencies was worth 3 times less than of those living in smaller constituencies. In the new system the difference between the population of the largest and smallest constituencies is lower than 30% (79208 and 109955) and the standard deviation of the population of the constituencies has also reduced from 20% to 8%. The average population of constituencies used to be 57089 and will be 94789 in 2014. The constituency borders do not (necessarily) coincide with city or district borders, however, they have to coincide with county borders and with the border of Budapest (so the 19 counties and Budapest are further divided to constituencies). Budapest used to consist of 32 constituencies and will consist of 18 in 2014.
 Registration - although it had been planned previously - will not be generally required for voting after being found unconstitutional, only those Hungarian citizens will have to register who do not reside in Hungary (do not have Hungarian address card), this registration will be valid for 10 years or until the change of address and will be automatically extended in case of voting (so practically Hungarian citizens outside Hungary will have to re-register only in case of not voting twice or in case of changing home address)

Nomination of candidates
All candidates must be at least 18 years old and Hungarian citizens.
Candidates standing for constituency seats must each have received at least 1000 proposal certificates.
Parties with candidates standing for election in at least 27 (out of 106) constituencies in at least 9 (out of 19) counties and Budapest may present (national) party lists.
 Each of the legally recognized national minority councils – currently: Armenian, Bulgarian, Croatian, German, Greek, Polish, Romani, Romanian, Rusyn, Serbian, Slovakian, Slovenian, and Ukrainian – may present minority lists (one list per council).

Voting
On Hungarian elections citizens can vote for a party-list (or a minority-list), and in case of residing in Hungary (which is checked by showing the address card) citizens can also vote for a constituency candidate who will be responsible for the local community in the National Assembly.
 At least 18 year old Hungarian citizens with Hungarian residence
 one vote for a party-list
 one vote for a constituency candidate
 At least 18 year old Hungarian citizens without Hungarian residence
 one vote for a party-list
 At least 18 year old Hungarian citizens with Hungarian residence registered as minority voter
 one vote for a constituency candidate
 one vote
 either for a party-list
 or for a minority-list

Implementation of voting
at local polling stations
Hungarian citizens with Hungarian residence (address card) staying in Hungary
showing the ID card -> being able to vote for a party-list (or a minority-list)
showing the address card -> being able to vote for a constituency candidate
at embassies, consulates
Hungarian citizens with Hungarian residence (address card) staying abroad
showing the ID card -> being able to vote for a party-list (or a minority-list)
showing the address card -> being able to vote for a constituency candidate
by mail
Hungarian citizens without Hungarian address card
registering for the elections by mail or electronically (valid for 10 years or until change of residential address, validity automatically extends by 10 years in case of voting), registered citizens receive the voting sheet (only the party-list) by mail, which they fulfill and send back to the election office.

Results
In case of the 106 constituency seats, the candidate that receives the most votes (not necessarily more than 50%) in the given constituency, obtains the constituency seat and will be responsible for that local region in the National Assembly. In the case of the 93 party-list seats, parties receive seats in proportion to the votes received out of all the party-list and minority-list votes. These numbers of seats obtained by the parties are calculated according to the D'Hondt method after checking out whether the party has reached the 5% threshold out of all the party-list votes and whether the minority has reached the 5% threshold out of all minority votes. If a minority-lists cannot obtain at least one seat then the first candidate on the minority-list will be minority spokesman, who has right to speak in the National Assembly but is not allowed to vote.

It is possible that the same person is a constituency candidate and a party-list candidate in the same time. If this person has obtained the seat in their constituency and would also obtain a seat because of the party-list that they are listed on then the next candidate in the party-list replaces the candidate that already has obtained a constituency seat. So, for example, someone being the 50th on a party-list can obtain a seat in the National Assembly even if their party has only won 30 party-list seats, if at least 20 candidates listed earlier than them win in their local constituency. (this rule has simplified as there is no county level between the constituency level and the national level)

Generally, big parties place their most important (national level) politicians only on the party-lists because these people want to deal only with national-level issues (like becoming minister). They represent citizens who voted for their parties and not the citizens of their local community, which is the responsibility of those MPs that obtain constituency seats. On the other hand, leaders of small parties usually qualify both on their party-lists and in their local constituencies because of maximizing votes; the leader of a small party might be much more famous or much more popular than an ordinary local politician of a big party.

By-elections

A by-election is an election held to fill a constituency seat that has become vacant between regularly scheduled elections. In case of the vacancy of a party-list seat, the next person on the list that is still interested gets to the National Assembly. This rule has not changed. Note, that by-elections from 2012 are held according to the new system, so only one round is held and no minimum turnout is needed, while the constituencies are the same until 2014.

Latest general election

Historical composition of the National Assembly since 1990 

The numbers come from the legislature's inaugural session. Later changes may occur:
 Vacancies from party list MPs do not change the make-up of the Assembly, as they are replaced by another member of the party list. But a vacancy in a district seat triggers a by-election, which, historically, is often won by another party. See List of Hungarian by-elections.
 New factions may appear
 in 1993, the nationalist-radicalist members of MDF quit the party and founded the MIÉP, which took part in the next three elections. It crossed the threshold only in 1998.
 in 2011, the DK faction led by former socialist prime minister Ferenc Gyurcsány, split from the MSZP and became a party of its own.
 in 2011 also, 8 MPs from LMP left the party to set up Dialogue for Hungary

Prime ministers and their governments since 1989
Parties

 SZDSZ left the Gyurcsány II Cabinet on 20 April 2008 and kept supporting it externally.

 The Bajnai Cabinet was supported externally by SZDSZ.

Local elections

Elections for mayors and municipalities occur every five years (formerly every four years in the autumn following the general elections). On the local elections, the following are elected directly by the voters:

in Budapest
 Lord Mayor of Budapest (now since 2019: Gergely Karácsony, between 1990 and 2010: Gábor Demszky)
 members of the City Council of Budapest (since 2010: 33, 1994-2010: 66, 1990-1994: 88)
 voters vote for party-lists
 Mayors of the districts of Budapest
 members of the District Council
 districts of Budapest are divided to election zones (not to be confused with the constituencies of the country), and voters can vote for one of the candidates representing their election zone in the District Council

in the towns/cities with county rank:
 Mayor of the town/city
 members of the Town/City Council
 voters vote for party-lists

in the counties (excluding towns/cities with county rank):
 members of the County Council
 voters vote for party-lists
 Mayors of the cities, towns, villages
 members of the City/Town/Village Council
 cities, towns and villages larger than 10000 inhabitants are divided to election zones (not to be confused with the constituencies of the country), and voters can vote for one of the candidates representing their election zone in the City/Town Council
 towns and villages smaller than 10000 inhabitants are not divided to election zones, in these villages voters can choose as many candidates out of all the candidates as many seats there are in the Village Council, so for instance in a Village Council, where 7 seats are available and there are 15 candidates, the voters can vote for 1 to 7 candidates. Exception if the village is administratively part of a town or city, in this case the village has got one seat in the Town/City Council and villagers can only vote for one candidate representing their village in the Town/City Council just like in case of the election zones of the towns and cities. In this case the village is considered to be one of the election zones of the town/city.

The chairman of the County Council is elected by the members of the Council, unlike the Lord Mayor of Budapest or the Mayors of towns/cities with county rank, which are elected directly by people.

Latest local elections

European Parliament elections

Since the EU expansion to Romania and Bulgaria, Hungary delegates 22 members to the European Parliament based on the Nice treaty. Any EU citizens with residence in Hungary have the right to vote for a party-list. In case of the EU elections there are no constituency votes.

The latest EP election in Hungary took place on 26 May 2019, which was the fourth one at all, after the 2004 EP election, which took place on 13 June 2004, bit more than a month after the EU expansion to 10 Eastern European countries.

Results:

|-
|style="background-color:#E9E9E9" align=center valign=top colspan="2"|Parties
!style="background-color:#E9E9E9" align=center rowspan="2"|Votes 2004
!style="background-color:#E9E9E9" align=center rowspan="2"|%   2004
!style="background-color:#E9E9E9" align=center rowspan="2"|Seats 2004
!style="background-color:#E9E9E9" align=center rowspan="2"|Votes 2009
!style="background-color:#E9E9E9" align=center rowspan="2"|%   2009
!style="background-color:#E9E9E9" align=center rowspan="2"|Seats 2009
!style="background-color:#E9E9E9" align=center rowspan="2"|Difference
|-
!style="background-color:#E9E9E9" align= center colspan="1"|National Party
!style="background-color:#E9E9E9" align= center |European party
|-
|align=left|Fidesz - Hungarian Civic Union (Fidesz)
|align=left|EPP
|valign=center|1,457,750
|valign=center|47.40
|valign=center|12
|valign=center|1,632,309
|valign=center|56,36
|valign=center|14 
|valign=center|+2
|-
|align=left|Hungarian Socialist Party (MSZP)
|align=left|PES
|valign=center|1,054,921
|valign=center|34.30
|valign=center|9
|valign=center|503,140
|valign=center|17,37
|valign=center|4 
|valign=center|-5
|-
|align=left|Jobbik
|align=left|none
|valign=center|did not run
|valign=center|-
|valign=center|-
|valign=center|427,773
|valign=center|14,77
|valign=center|3 
|valign=center|+3
|-
|align=left|Hungarian Democratic Forum (MDF) 
|align=left|ECR
|valign=center|164,025
|valign=center|5.33
|valign=center|1
|valign=center|153,660
|valign=center|5.31
|valign=center|1 
|valign=center|0
|-
|align=left|Politics Can Be Different (LMP)
|align=left|none
|valign=center|did not exist
|valign=center|-
|valign=center|-
|valign=center|75,522
|valign=center|2.61
|valign=center|0 
|valign=center|-
|-
|align=left|Alliance of Free Democrats (SZDSZ)
|align=left|ELDR
|valign=center|237,908
|valign=center|7.74 
|valign=center|2
|valign=center|62,527
|valign=center|2.16
|valign=center|0 
|valign=center|-2
|-
|align=left|Hungarian Communist Workers' Party (Munkáspárt) 
|align=left|none
|valign=center|56,221
|valign=center|1.83
|valign=center|0
|valign=center|27,817
|valign=center|0.96
|valign=center|0 
|valign=center|0
|-
|align=left|Gypsy Alliance Party (MCF)
|align=left|none
|valign=top|did not run
|valign=top|-
|valign=top|-
|valign=top|13,431
|valign=top|0.46
|valign=top|0 
|valign=center|-
|-

|-
|align=left style="background-color:#E9E9E9"|Total (turnout 36,31%)
|width="75" align="right" style="background-color:#E9E9E9"|
|width="75" align="right" style="background-color:#E9E9E9"|3,075,450
|width="30" align="right" style="background-color:#E9E9E9"|100.0
|width="30" align="right" style="background-color:#E9E9E9"|24
|width="75" align="right" style="background-color:#E9E9E9"|2,896,179 
|width="30" align="right" style="background-color:#E9E9E9"|100.0
|width="30" align="right" style="background-color:#E9E9E9"|22
|-
|align=left colspan=8|Source: Valasztas.hu
|}

Referendums
The Constitution of Hungary prescribes two ways to hold a referendum (Article 8):
 Parliament shall order a national referendum upon the motion of at least two hundred thousand electors
 Parliament may order a national referendum upon the motion of the President of the Republic, the Government or one hundred thousand electors.

The Constitution imposes a number of prohibitions on matters on which a referendum can be held, including amending Constitution, budget, taxing, obligations from international agreements, military operations, etc.

Required voter turnout for the referendum to be valid is 50%. The decision made by a referendum is binding on the Parliament.

Past referendums
There was one referendum in People's Republic of Hungary: referendum of 1989. There were 4 questions, all 4 passed.

There were 5 referendums in modern Hungary:
 Presidential election referendum in 1990 (1 question, failed because of low voter turnout)
 NATO membership referendum in 1997 (1 question, passed)
 European Union membership referendum in 2003 (1 question, passed)
 Dual citizenship referendum in 2004 (2 questions, both failed because of low voter turnout)
 Fees abolishment referendum in 2008 (3 question, all passed)
2016 Hungarian migrant quota referendum in 2016 (1 question, failed because of low voter turnout)

Presidential elections (indirect)

The President of Hungary, who has a largely ceremonial role under the country's constitution, is elected by the members of the National Assembly to serve for a term of five years (maximum two times), and has to quit their political party (if they have one) in order to be impartial and able to express the unity of the nation (so the "Political Party" column refers to their party membership, prior to becoming president).

Presidents of Hungary:Parties'The non-partisan Ferenc Mádl had been elected by the Fidesz-FKgp-MDF government in 2000, while the also non-partisan László Sólyom (former President of the Constitutional Court) had been elected president as the opposition Fidesz's and MDF's candidate in 2005. The minor party of the coalition government (SZDSZ) did not support the superior coalition government party's (MSZP) candidate, therefore Mr. Sólyom could win as an opposition candidate.

Past elections

The previous general elections (2010) in the country resulted in an overwhelming majority win for the conservative opposition party Fidesz (which gained a 2/3 supermajority by winning the 68% of the seats (52.7% of the votes)), as well the dramatic rise of the far-right newcomers Jobbik (12.2% of seats, 16.7% of votes), who were just 2.5% short of the former ruling Hungarian Socialist Party (15.3% of seats, 19.3% of votes).

The green liberal, social progressivist Politics Can Be Different (4.1% of seats, 7.5% of votes) was also newcomer, while the liberal conservative formerly parliamentary Hungarian Democratic Forum (2.7% of votes) could not achieve the 5% threshold, and the formerly parliamentary (and also member of the coalition government before 2009) Alliance of Free Democrats was not able to run on the election because of the large decrease of popularity.

This election has changed the balance of power in the National Assembly of Hungary the most significantly since the end of the communist one-party system, as two brand new political forces could have got to the National Assembly while two formerly parliamentary parties fell out and the support of previous ruling party had significantly decreased (from 48.2% to 15.3% of seats, from 40.3% to 19.3% of votes).

 Electoral system for National Assembly elections between 1990 and 2010 
Until 2010, elections for the 386-seat National Assembly (Országgyűlés'') involved two separate ballots, two rounds, and three classes of seats: 176 members were elected in single-member districts through a two-round system, and 146 were elected through proportional representation in 20 regional multi-member constituencies (MMCs), in a non-compensatory way (parallel allocation). Finally, 64 nationwide levelling seats were allocated in such a way to correct for discrepancies between votes and seats in the different constituencies (the number of multi-member district seats and levelling seats varied over time; the shares shown here were for the 2010 election). For both MMCs and levelling seats, the electoral threshold was 5% of the MMC vote. (Where two parties presented a joint list, their threshold was 10%; for three or more joined parties, the threshold was 15%.)

The second round would be held two weeks after the first, in situations where no candidate in the single-member district won and/or where the MMC result was invalidated due to low turnout.

First round
In the first round, each voter may cast
 one vote for one candidate running for the local single-seat constituency;
 one vote for a party list established in the local MMC.
After the polls close:
 The result in single-seat constituencies where voter turnout was below 50% is declared invalid, and all candidates for the first round enter the second round.
 Any single-seat constituency where turnout was over 50% and one candidate received over 50% of the votes is won by that candidate, and no second round takes place.
 In all remaining single-seat constituencies (i.e., where turnout exceeded 50% but no candidate received over 50% of votes), the top three candidates and any other candidates having received at least 15% of votes are eligible (a kind of runoff voting).
 The result for MMCs where the turnout was over 50% is produced. (If all MMCs saw adequate turnout, the parties passing the election threshold could already be determined and the MMC seats could be allocated.)

Second round
In the second round, each voter may cast
 one vote for one candidate still standing in the single-seat constituency, if the seat was not won in the first round;
 one vote for a party list in the MMC, if the first round was invalid due to insufficient turnout.
After the polls close:
 Any seats in single-seat constituencies where turnout was below 25%, or where the first two candidates received an equal number of votes, will remain vacant.
 All other single-seat constituencies will be won by the candidate who received the most votes.
 The result of MMC where turnout was below 25% is declared invalid, and the seats from that constituency are added to the compensation seats.
 The parties passing the threshold are identified based on MMCs with a valid result. Seats from these constituencies are distributed.
 Parties having passed the threshold are eligible for the compensation seats; these are distributed based on:
 the sum of votes remaining in the MMCs after the distribution of the seats, plus
 the sum of votes cast for losing candidates of each party in the first valid round of each single-seat constituency (similar to the scorporo system). Since the first valid round is taken into account, votes are still counted for a candidate who is eliminated in the first round, or who steps down after a valid first round to endorse another, more viable candidate.

See also
 List of Hungarian by-elections
 Electoral calendar
 Electoral system
 International Criticism of Fourth Amendment of the 2011 Constitution

Notes

References

External links
National Election Office Hungary
Politics.hu - English-language resource about Hungarian politics
NSD: European Election Database - Hungary
Adam Carr's Election Archive
Parties and elections